Bastián Alejandro Roco González (born 24 October 2003) is a Chilean professional footballer who plays as a centre-back for Chilean Primera División side Huachipato.

Club career
A product of Unión San Felipe youth team, Roco was a substitute in the Primera B match against Deportes La Serena on 2 June 2019, at the age of 15. In 2020, he was in a brief trial step with Estudiantes de La Plata. 

On second half 2020, he was transferred to Huachipato youth system, making his professional debut in the 2021 Copa Chile match against San Antonio Unido on 23 June 2021.

International career
Roco took part of the Chile U15 squad at the UEFA U-16 Development Tournament in Finland on April 2019. In December 2021, he represented Chile U20 at the friendly tournament Rául Coloma Rivas, playing the three matches. In July 2022, he made two appearances for Chile U20 against Peru U20.

Personal life
Roco belongs to a football family from San Felipe since both his father, Sebastián, a former Chile international footballer, and his grandfather, Marcial, played for Unión San Felipe. In addition, the cousin of Marcial, Héctor Roco Lucero, is a historical player of Unión San Felipe and was the assistant coach of his son, Héctor Roco Leiva, from 2020 to 2021.

References

External links
 
 Bastián Roco at PlayMakerStats

2003 births
Living people
People from San Felipe, Chile
Chilean footballers
Chile youth international footballers
Chile under-20 international footballers
Association football forwards
Unión San Felipe footballers
C.D. Huachipato footballers
Primera B de Chile players
Chilean Primera División players